Giuseppe Santini (1735–1796) was an Italian abbot and a mathematician.

Santini was born in Staffolo. He taught philosophy and mathematics at Collegio di Osimo. The Picenorum mathematicorum elogia is his most known work and provides useful information about the academic field status at the time.

Works

References 

18th-century Italian mathematicians
1735 births
1796 deaths
People from the Province of Ancona